The 2000 Cairns Cyclones season was the fifth and final season that the Cairns Cyclones rugby league team competed in the Queensland Cup. Due to sponsorship requirements, the competition was renamed the Bundy Gold Cup. Twelve teams competed in the 22 round competition. The Cairns Cyclones team was managed by Nigel Tillett and coached by Brad Tessman.

2000 Queensland Cup

2000 Cairns Cyclones Squad

Scott Williamson
Jason Barsley
Tim Kopp
Ty Walter
Leon Yeatman
Steve Singleton
Shannon Furber
Paul Fowler
Jason Berg
Clint Arnol
Victor Akiba
Kerry Amory
Quinton Nicol
Bronson Ryan
Anthony Sexton
Mark Fakahua
Neil Stanley
Lama Ahmat
Ty Williams
Adam Bowditch
Noel Slade
Patrick Gardner
Clint Zammit
Karl Dawson
Brad Coey-Braddon

2000 Ladder

2000 Queensland Cup Minor Premiers and Premiers

Minor Premiers:  Redcliffe Dolphins
Premiers:  Redcliffe Dolphins

2000 Cairns Cyclones Matches

Rugby league in Queensland